Anthony Paul Taylor (born November 30, 1965) is an American former professional basketball player who was selected by the Atlanta Hawks in the 2nd round (44th overall) of the 1988 NBA Draft. A 6'4" (1.93 m) guard from the University of Oregon, Taylor played for only one year (1988-89) with the Miami Heat, their inaugural NBA season.

In his NBA career, Taylor appeared in 21 games and scored a total of 144 points.

External links
NBA stats @ basketballreference.com

1965 births
Living people
American expatriate basketball people in Italy
American men's basketball players
Atlanta Hawks draft picks
Auxilium Pallacanestro Torino players
Basketball players from Los Angeles
Beaverton High School alumni
Miami Heat players
Oregon Ducks men's basketball players
Shooting guards
Universiade medalists in basketball
Universiade silver medalists for the United States
Medalists at the 1987 Summer Universiade